Fontana Distribution was a division of San Francisco-based Isolation Network (now owned by the Virgin Music Group unit of the Universal Music Group since 2019). A minority stake of the company was owned by Universal Music until Ingrooves acquired Fontana Distribution from UMG in 2012 to form Ingrooves Fontana.

In 2019, Universal Music Group acquired Fontana's owner, Ingrooves, returning Fontana back to UMG. A year later, Fontana Distribution was folded into Caroline Distribution, acquired in 2013 via Universal’s purchase of EMI, which, another year later, was rebranded as Virgin Music Label & Artist Services.

Profile
Fontana deals in distribution, as well as in a range of sales, marketing, and back office support services, for a diverse roster of independent record labels and their artists. The company takes its name and logo from the Fontana Records label; it was initially launched by Universal Music Group in 2004 and later sold to Isolation Network in 2012. The company includes a UK-based operation, Fontana International, which handles territories outside of North America. The company also has a joint venture in Canada with Cadence Music Group known as Fontana North. The company is the successor of PolyGram's Independent Label Sales (ILS), previously known as Island Trading Co., which folded after the 1999 merger of the MCA and PolyGram families of labels that created Universal Music Group.

Fontana Distribution has been known to successfully round up albums worldwide from national Universal Music Group companies for American release or for distribution into further territories. Fontana Distribution also partners with Executive Music Group, Chicago Independent Distribution, and Twenty Two Music Group Distribution, which in turn distribute other independent labels.

During the acquisition of EMI (including EMI Music Distribution), Universal Music Group decided to retain Caroline Distribution and later sold Fontana Distribution to Isolation Network.

After the acquisition of Ingrooves by Universal, Fontana was folded into Caroline, which was renamed Virgin Music Label & Artist Services in 2021.

Fontana Distribution-affiliated labels
Fontana Distribution is affiliated with more than 30 labels, including the following:

ATP Records
ATO Records
Angeles Records
Bridge 9 Records
Black Diamond Record Companies-IHP Media Groups Music Systems
Cadence Recordings
Cement Shoes Records
Constellation Records
Century Media
Delicious Vinyl
Dangerbird Records
Dischord Records
Downtown Records (select releases)
ECMD Film & Music Distribution
Element 9
Eleven Seven Music
Epitaph Records
Emanon Records
Extreme Music
Ferret Music
Famous Records
Fat Wreck Chords
Fat Possum Records
Fontana Records
Global Underground
Hatchet House
Hoo-Bangin' Records
Hopeless Records
InVogue Records
Ipecac Recordings
Kung Fu Records
Little Idiot
Mad Science
Ministry of Sound
Mpire Music Group
Matador Records
Mancini Entertainment Group
MySpace Records
Metal Blade Records
No Sleep Records
Napalm Records
Nuclear Blast
Nitro Records
Pocket Kid Records
Prosthetic Records
Pure Noise Records
Pipe Dreams Records
Psycho+Logical-Records 
Psychopathic Records 
Real Talk Entertainment
Relativity Music Group
Rap-A-Lot Records
Rostrum Records
Rise Records
SideOneDummy Records
Solid State Records
Sumerian Records
StandBy Records
Strange Music
SMC Recordings
SoBe Entertainment
SoSouth
Telarc Records
Trustkill Records
Tooth & Nail Records
Trill Entertainment
TortureSquad Inc. 
Twenty Two Recordings
VP Records
Vagrant Records
WaterTower Music
Wichita Recordings (select releases)
Warcon Enterprises

Divisions
Fontana Distribution
Fontana Label Services
Fontana International

See also
Fontana North

References

External links
 Fontana Distribution
 Fontana North
 Executive Music Group (EMG)

Record label distributors
Universal Music Group
Companies based in Los Angeles County, California